The Estrela Basilica or the Royal Basilica and Convent of the Most Sacred Heart of Jesus, is a minor basilica and ancient carmelite convent in Lisbon, Portugal.

Ordered built by Queen Maria I of Portugal as the fulfilment of a vow, the Basilica is not only a product of the Queen's particularly fervent devotion to the Sacred Heart of Jesus, but remains the most important architectural endeavour of her reign. The Estrela Basilica was the first church in the world dedicated to the Sacred Heart of Jesus.

History 
Shortly after her wedding to her uncle Infante Peter of Braganza in 1760, Maria, Princess of Brazil vowed, before an image of the Sacred Heart of Jesus in the Convent of Carnide, to build a church and convent under the Rule of Saint Theresa if she was given the grace of bearing children that would assure the succession of the House of Braganza. Princess Maria was, at the time, the eldest daughter and heiress presumptive of King Joseph I, whom she eventually succeeded after his death in 1777. She gave birth to her first child, Joseph, Prince of Beira, on 20 August 1761 (who died of smallpox in 1788, while construction of the Basilica was underway).

Only after acceding to the throne could Queen Maria afford to see to the fulfilment of her vow. Construction began in 1779; the groundbreaking ceremony took place on 24 October: the Queen's husband, Peter III, laid the first cornerstone and Fr.  delivered the speech.

Mateus Vicente de Oliveira, an important court architect, is made in charge of the works: it is under his direction that the construction of the conventual areas was carried out (from February 1778 to May 1781), as well as the beginning of the Basilica. Oliveira died in 1785, and was replaced with Reinaldo Manuel dos Santos, who saw to the conclusion of the works. Reinaldo Manuel made substantial alterations to the exterior design of the church (namely, a different design of the pediment, of the façade, of the bell towers, and of the dome to which he added a roof lantern).

Architecture 
The huge church has a giant dome, and is located in a hill in what was at the time the western part of Lisbon and can be viewed from far away. The style is similar to the Mafra National Palace, in late baroque and neoclassical. The front has twin bell towers and includes statues of saints and some allegoric figures.

A large quantity of grey, pink and yellow marble was used in the floor and walls, in intricate geometric patterns, one of the most beautiful in European churches. Several paintings by Pompeo Batoni also contribute to a balanced design. The tomb of the Queen Maria I is in the right transept. A famous nativity scene made by sculptor Joaquim Machado de Castro, with more than 500 figures in cork and terra cotta is a major attraction to visitors.

See also
St. George's Anglican Church - located nearby

References

External links 

18th-century Roman Catholic church buildings in Portugal
1790 establishments in Portugal
Basilica churches in Portugal
Roman Catholic churches completed in 1790
Roman Catholic churches in Lisbon
Votive churches
National monuments in Lisbon District
Church buildings with domes